Bertrand Tavernier (25 April 1941 – 25 March 2021) was a French director, screenwriter, actor and producer.

Life and career
Tavernier was born in Lyon, France, the son of Geneviève (née Dumond) and René Tavernier, a publicist and writer, several years president of the French PEN club. He said his father's publishing of a wartime resistance journal and aid to anti-Nazi intellectuals shaped his moral outlook as an artist. According to Tavernier, his father believed that words were "as important and as lethal as bullets". Tavernier wanted to become a filmmaker from the age of 13 or 14 years. He said that his cinematic influences included filmmakers John Ford, William Wellman, Jean Renoir, Jean Vigo and Jacques Becker. Tavernier was influenced by the 1968 general strike in France. He associated with the OCI between 1973 and 1975, and was particularly struck by the writing of Leon Trotsky. The first film director with whom he worked was Jean-Pierre Melville. Later, his first film (The Clockmaker, 1974) won the Prix Louis Delluc and the Silver Bear – Special Jury Prize award at the 24th Berlin International Film Festival.

His early work was dominated by mysteries, but his later work is characterized by a more overt social commentary, highlighting his left-wing views (Life and Nothing But, Captain Conan) and presenting a critical picture of contemporary French society (It All Starts Today, Histoires de vies brisées : les double-peine de Lyon).

In 1986, his film Round Midnight won two César Awards (Best Original Music and Best Sound), the Best Film Award at the Venice Film Festival and the Oscar for Best Music (Original Score) at the 1987 Academy Awards.
 
He won the BAFTA for best film in a language other than English in 1990 for Life and Nothing But and a total of four César Awards and was joint winner of another.

In 1995, his film L'Appât won the Golden Bear Award at the 45th Berlin International Film Festival. Four years later, his film It All Starts Today won an Honourable Mention at the 49th Berlin International Film Festival.

His film The Princess of Montpensier competed for the Palme d'Or at the 2010 Cannes Film Festival.

Tavernier was married to screenwriter Claudine (Colo) O'Hagan from 1965 to 1981. They had two children. Their son, Nils Tavernier (born 1 September 1965), works as both a director and actor. Their daughter, Tiffany Tavernier (born in 1967), is a novelist, screenwriter and assistant director. 

Tavernier was honored with a Lifetime Achievement Award at the 42nd International Film Festival of India in Goa for his outstanding achievements and work in the film industry. He died on 25 March 2021 at age 79, a month before his 80th birthday.

Filmography

References

External links 

 
 
 
 Senses of Cinema: Great Directors Critical Database
 Emily Zants (1999). "Bertrand Tavernier: Fractured Narrative and Bourgeois Values", The Scarecrow Press, Inc., Lanham, MD, and London. The Table of Contents and Introductory Chapter
 An interview with Bertrand Tavernier: "My job is to dream and invent, and out of this produce something that will change the world" - World Socialist Web Site
 Bertrand Tavernier speaks with the World Socialist Web Site
 An interview with Bertrand Tavernier on his film The Princess of Montpensier at subtitledonline.com
 Bertrand Tavernier in Conversation with Melinda Camber Porter PDF
 Veteran French filmmaker Bertrand Tavernier (1941–2021): In genuine appreciation - World Socialist Web Site

1941 births
2021 deaths
Mass media people from Lyon
French male film actors
French film directors
French male screenwriters
French screenwriters
French film producers
Filmmakers who won the Best Foreign Language Film BAFTA Award
Cannes Film Festival Award for Best Director winners
Best Director César Award winners
Directors of Golden Bear winners
Lycée Henri-IV alumni
French male television actors
20th-century French male actors